Herbert Hales may refer to:
 Bert Hales, English footballer
 Herbert 'Willie' Hales, English table tennis player